Medical Education Number (ME Number) is an 11-digit number assigned to every physician member of the AMA in the United States by the American Medical Association for identification and recording of basic physician information and CME credits. The number is assigned when a student begins medical school and can remain unchanged throughout their career. The first 5 digits represent the Medical School Code. Digits 6 and 7 represent the 2 digit expected graduation year. The final 4 digits are uniquely assigned to the physician. The ME number is found on the physician's AMA membership card. As each physician in the United States has a ME Number assigned to them, physicians who are not members of the AMA may find out their ME number by calling the American Medical Association. It is used as a unique identifying key field to find records for a physician on the  AMA Physician Masterfile.

References

Medical education in the United States
American Medical Association